Otukaia ikukoae is a deepwater sea snail, a marine gastropod mollusc in the family Calliostomatidae, the calliostoma top snails.

Distribution
Okinawa Trough.

Ecology
It was recorded 962 m deep.

References

External links

Calliostomatidae
Gastropods described in 1994